John Bromwich defeated Adrian Quist 6–4, 6–1, 6–2 in the final to win the men's singles tennis title at the 1939 Australian Championships.

Seeds
The seeded players are listed below. John Bromwich is the champion; others show the round in which they were eliminated.

 John Bromwich (champion)
 Adrian Quist (finalist)
 Harry Hopman (quarterfinals)
 Jack Crawford (semifinals)
 Len Schwartz (second round)
 Vivian McGrath (semifinals)
 Don Turnbull (quarterfinals)
 Jack Harper (first round)

Draw

Key
 Q = Qualifier
 WC = Wild card
 LL = Lucky loser
 r = Retired

Finals

Earlier rounds

Section 1

Section 2

External links
 

1939 in Australian tennis
1939
Men's Singles